The 2008–09 Temple Owls men's basketball team represented Temple University in the 2008–09 NCAA Division I men's basketball season. They were led by head coach Fran Dunphy and played their home games at the Liacouras Center. The Owls are members of the Atlantic 10 Conference. They finished the season 22–12 and 11–5 in A-10 play. They won the 2009 Atlantic 10 men's basketball tournament for the second consecutive year to receive the conference's automatic bid to the 2009 NCAA Division I men's basketball tournament.

Dionte Christmas led Temple in three statistics: points per game (19.5), three-pointers completed  (107), and total steals (51); he finished second in two more: rebounds per game (5.5) and assists (28). In addition, he was an honorable mention All-American and scored 2,000 points over his college basketball career. Also graduating were two other starters: 7–0 center Sergio Olmos, who was selected as an All-A10 Tournament player, and point guard Semaj Inge.

Preseason
On October 28, 2008, the Owls were picked by other Atlantic 10 coaches to finish second, behind Xavier, and received 12 first place votes. Dionte Christmas was chosen to the Preseason First Team after leading the league in scoring the past two seasons. Lavoy Allen was named to the Preseason Defensive Team.

Roster

Schedule

|- align="center" bgcolor="#D8FFEB"
| 1
| November 14
| East Tennessee State
| W 79–65
| Dionte Christmas – 26
| Lavoy Allen – 15
| Christmas/Semaj Inge – 6
| Carolina First Arena, Charleston, SC (527)
| 1–0
|- align="center" bgcolor="#D8FFEB"
| 2
| November 15
| College of Charleston
| W 70–65
| Christmas – 26
| Allen – 12
| Luis Guzman – 5
| Carolina First Arena, Charleston, SC (2,532)
| 2–0
|- align="center" bgcolor="#FFE6E6"
| 3
| November 16
| Clemson
| L 76–72
| Ryan Brooks – 19
| Guzman – 7
| Guzman – 7
| Carolina First Arena, Charleston, SC (3,026)
| 2–1
|- align="center" bgcolor="#D8FFEB"
| 4
| November 21
| Lafayette
| W 71–55
| Christmas – 29
| Christmas – 12
| Christmas/Guzman – 3
| Allan P. Kirby Arena, Easton, PA (3,297)
| 3–1
|- align="center" bgcolor="#FFE6E6"
| 5
| November 29
| Buffalo
| L 83–73
| Christmas – 25
| Christmas – 6
| Guzman – 7
| Alumni Arena, Buffalo, NY (2,035)
| 3–2
|-

|- align="center" bgcolor="#FFE6E6"
| 6
| December 3
| Miami (OH)
| L 68–52
| Sergio Olmos – 12
| Brooks – 6
| Inge – 5
| Liacouras Center, Philadelphia, PA (5,029)
| 3–3
|- align="center" bgcolor="#D8FFEB"
| 7
| December 6
| Penn State
| W 65–59
| Inge – 19
| Allen – 10
| Inge – 6
| Bryce Jordan Center, State College, PA (9,833)
| 4–3
|- align="center" bgcolor="#D8FFEB"
| 8
| December 13
| #8 Tennessee
| W 88–72
| Christmas – 35
| Brooks – 10
| Inge – 4
| Liacouras Center, Philadelphia, PA (8,068)
| 5–3
|- align="center" bgcolor="#FFE6E6"
| 9
| December 20
| Kansas
| L 71–59
| Christmas – 21
| Allen – 7
| Allen – 5
| Phog Allen Fieldhouse, Lawrence, KS (16,300)
| 5–4
|- align="center" bgcolor="#FFE6E6"
| 10
| December 22
| Long Beach State
| L 76–71
| Christmas – 19
| Allen – 11
| Allen – 5
| Walter Pyramid, Long Beach, CA (2,042)
| 5–5
|- align="center" bgcolor="#FFE6E6"
| 11
| December 29
| #13 Villanova
| L 62–45
| Christmas – 13
| Christmas/Olmos – 5
| Christmas – 4
| The Pavilion, Villanova, PA (6,500)
| 5–6
|-

|- align="center" bgcolor="#D8FFEB"
| 12
| January 5
| Kent State
| W 73–58
| Christmas – 26
| Allen – 10
| Brooks/Juan Fernandez – 4
| Liacouras Center, Philadelphia, PA (3,508)
| 6–6
|- align="center" bgcolor="#D8FFEB"
| 13
| January 7
| Eastern Michigan
| W 67–45
| Christmas – 17
| Allen – 5
| Allen/Christmas – 3
| Convocation Center, Ypsilanti, MI (493)
| 7–6
|- align="center" bgcolor="#D8FFEB"
| 14
| January 11
| La Salle
| W 75–68
| Christmas – 30
| Allen/Inge – 6
| Inge – 6
| Tom Gola Arena, Philadelphia, PA (3,510)
| 8–6(1–0)
|- align="center" bgcolor="#D8FFEB"
| 15
| January 14
| Pennsylvania
| W 78–53
| Christmas – 25
| Christmas – 9
| Inge/Fernandez – 5
| The Palestra, Philadelphia, PA (4,261)
| 9–6
|- align="center" bgcolor="#FFE6E6"
| 16
| January 17
| UMass
| L 79–75
| Christmas – 26
| Christmas – 9
| Allen – 5
| William D. Mullins Center, Amherst, MA (7,182)
| 9–7(1–1)
|- align="center" bgcolor="#D8FFEB"
| 17
| January 22
| Saint Louis
| W 65–40
| Allen – 16
| Allen/Christmas – 7
| Christmas – 5
| Liacouras Center, Philadelphia, PA (4,856)
| 10–7(2–1)
|- align="center" bgcolor="#D8FFEB"
| 18
| January 24
| Charlotte
| W 80–53
| Inge – 19
| Allen – 10
| Fernandez – 4
| Liacouras Center, Philadelphia, PA (5,747)
| 11–7(3–1)
|- align="center" bgcolor="#FFE6E6"
| 19
| January 28
| Rhode Island
| L 67–59
| Christmas – 27
| Micheal Eric – 7
| Guzman – 3
| Thomas M. Ryan Center, Kingston, RI (5,028)
| 11–8(3–2)
|- align="center" bgcolor="#D8FFEB"
| 20
| January 31
| Richmond
| W 74–65
| Inge – 19
| Christmas – 13
| Christmas – 3
| Liacouras Center, Philadelphia, PA (6,087)
| 12–8(4–2)
|-

|- align="center" bgcolor="#FFE6E6"
| 21
| February 5
| #9 Xavier
| L 83–74
| Olmos – 18
| Allen – 14
| Christmas – 8
| Cintas Center, Cincinnati, OH (10,250)
| 12–9(4–3)
|- align="center" bgcolor="#D8FFEB"
| 22
| February 8
| Rhode Island
| W 68–62
| Allen – 23
| Allen – 13
| Inge – 7
| Liacouras Center, Philadelphia, PA (5,654)
| 13–9(5–3)
|- align="center" bgcolor="#D8FFEB"
| 23
| February 12
| Saint Joseph's
| W 61–59
| Christmas – 19
| Christmas – 11
| Christmas/Inge – 4
| The Palestra, Philadelphia, PA (8,722)
| 14–9(6–3)
|- align="center" bgcolor="#D8FFEB"
| 24
| February 15
| Duquesne
| W 78–73
| Fernandez – 19
| Craig Williams – 6
| Christmas – 4
| A.J. Palumbo Center, Pittsburgh, PA (4,029)
| 15–9(7–3)
|- align="center" bgcolor="#D8FFEB"
| 25
| February 18
| Fordham
| W 72–45
| Allen – 19
| Allen – 11
| Fernandez – 4
| Liacouras Center, Philadelphia, PA (3,837)
| 16–9(8–3)
|- align="center" bgcolor="#D8FFEB"
| 26
| February 22
| St. Bonaventure
| W 70–56
| Allen – 20
| Allen – 18
| Allen – 4
| Liacouras Center, Philadelphia, PA (7,092)
| 17–9(9–3)
|- align="center" bgcolor="#FFE6E6"
| 27
| February 26
| La Salle
| L 70–63
| Christmas – 19
| Allen – 12
| Fernandez – 6
| Liacouras Center, Philadelphia, PA (6,031)
| 17–10(9–4)
|- align="center" bgcolor="#FFE6E6"
| 28
| February 28
| Dayton
| L 70–65
| Christmas/Brooks – 20
| Allen – 11
| Guzman – 4
| University of Dayton Arena, Dayton, OH (13,435)
| 17–11(9–5)
|-

|- align="center" bgcolor="#D8FFEB"
| 29
| March 5
| Saint Joseph's
| W 68–59
| Christmas – 23
| Williams – 9
| Fernandez – 5
| Liacouras Center, Philadelphia, PA (9,349)
| 18–11(10–5)
|- align="center" bgcolor="#D8FFEB"
| 30
| March 7
| George Washington
| W 63–53
| Allen – 17
| Allen – 16
| Inge – 5
| Charles E. Smith Center, Washington, DC (2,828)
| 19–11(11–5)
|- align="center" bgcolor="#D8FFEB"
| 31
| March 12
| Saint Joseph's
| W 79–65
| Brooks – 19
| Allen – 13
| Inge/Christmas – 4
| Boardwalk Hall, Atlantic City, NJ (4,837)
| 20–11
|- align="center" bgcolor="#D8FFEB"
| 32
| March 13
| #19 Xavier
| W 55–53
| Christmas – 20
| Allen – 11
| Christmas – 3
| Boardwalk Hall, Atlantic City, NJ 
| 21–11
|- align="center" bgcolor="#D8FFEB"
| 33
| March 14
| Duquesne
| W 69–64
| Christmas – 29
| Allen – 14
| Inge – 8
| Boardwalk Hall, Atlantic City, NJ (6,823)
| 22–11
|- align="center" bgcolor="#FFE6E6"
| 34
| March 20
| Arizona State
| L 66–57
| Christmas – 29
| Allen – 10
| Allen/Inge – 4
| AmericanAirlines Arena, Miami, FL (10,163)
| 22–12
|-

Season

Preconference season
Dionte Christmas scored 35 points to lead Temple past #8 Tennessee on December 13 88–72. This was Temple's first win over a top ten team since the 2006 Atlantic 10 men's basketball tournament, when the Owls upset #6 George Washington; John Chaney was coaching Temple at the time. The Owls started the game with an 8–0 lead and never faltered, with Tennessee only tying the score at 15 and never leading. Christmas started the second half with a three-pointer and scored three consecutive threes on a 17–6 run. For the game, he was 7-for-14 from the perimeter and 12-for-22 from the field. Sergio Olmos's 19 points were a career high, and Ryan Brooks registered a double-double of 16 points and 12 rebounds.

Postseason
Temple was given a four seed in the 2009 Atlantic 10 men's basketball tournament; they received a bye and faced Saint Joseph's in the quarterfinals.

In the 2009 NCAA Division I men's basketball tournament, Temple was seeded eleventh in the South Regional, where they faced the sixth-seeded Arizona State Sun Devils in the first round. On March 20, 2009, behind a then career-high 22 points by Sun Devil Derek Glasser, Arizona State eliminated Temple 66–57. The Owls never had a lead, but cut the deficit to 52–49, the closest the game ever got. Temple's offense went without a field goal in the final 5:02. However, their defense held Arizona State star James Harden to nine points, less than half his season average, and 1-of-8 shooting. Dionte Christmas played all 40 minutes, shot 5-for-11 from behind the arc and scored 29 points in his final collegiate game.

References

Temple
Temple
Temple Owls men's basketball seasons
Temple
Temple